The 1969–70 season was the 68th season in which Dundee competed at a Scottish national level, playing in Division One, where the club would finish in 6th place. Domestically, Dundee would also compete in both the Scottish League Cup and the Scottish Cup, where they would get knocked out in the League Cup group stages, and make it to the Scottish Cup semi-finals before being knocked out by Celtic.

Scottish Division One 

Statistics provided by Dee Archive.

League table

Scottish League Cup 

Statistics provided by Dee Archive.

Group 3

Group 3 table

Scottish Cup 

Statistics provided by Dee Archive.

Player statistics 
Statistics provided by Dee Archive

|}

See also 

 List of Dundee F.C. seasons

References

External links 

 1969-70 Dundee season on Fitbastats

Dundee F.C. seasons
Dundee